Hamdy El-Said Abdelwahab (born 22 January 1993) is an Egyptian Greco-Roman wrestler and mixed martial artist currently competing in the heavyweight division of the Ultimate Fighting Championship. He competed in the men's Greco-Roman 98 kg event at the 2016 Summer Olympics, in which he was eliminated in the round of 16 by Alin Alexuc-Ciurariu.

Mixed martial arts career

Gamebred Fighting Championship 
Abdelwahab made his mixed martial arts debut for Jorge Masvidal's bare-knuckle MMA promotion Gamebred Fighting Championship, defeating Matthew Strickland via first-round TKO at Gamebred FC 2 on October 1, 2021.

He made his sophomore appearance on Gamebred FC by defeating Connor McKenna by first-round technical knockout at Gamebred FC 3.

iKon Fighting Championship
Abdelwahab next appeared on iKon FC, where he defeated Dustin Clements by third-round technical knockout on January 21, 2022.

He then defeated Matthew Strickland via first-round knockout at iKon FC 3 on June 3, 2022.

Ultimate Fighting Championship
On June 28, 2022, it was announced that Abdelwahab had signed with the UFC, making him the first Egyptian fighter to sign with the organization.  

Abdelwahab made his promotional debut at UFC 277 against Don'Tale Mayes. He won the fight via a split decision victory over his opponent. and later was overturned to no-contest after tested positive for banned substance.

Abdelwahab was scheduled to face Parker Porter on October 22, 2022, at UFC 280. However, Abdelwahab was removed from the event for unknown reasons and he was replaced by Slim Trabelsi.

In early February 2023, Abdelwahab had accepted a 2–year suspension from USADA after he tested positive for the banned anabolic agent Metenolone during two drug tests in late summer 2022. He will be able to compete again on July 30, 2024.

Championships and accomplishments

Greco-Roman wrestling 
Summer Youth Olympic Games 
  2010 Youth Olympic Games –85 kg Runner Up 

Africa & Oceania Olympic Qualifiers 
  2016 Africa & Oceania Olympic Qualification –98 kg Greco-Roman Champion 

Summer Olympic Games
 2016 Olympic Games –98 kg 10th Place

Mixed martial arts record

|-
|NC
|align=center|5–0 (1)
|Don'Tale Mayes
|
|UFC 277
|
|align=center|3
|align=center|5:00
|Dallas, Texas, United States
|
|-
|Win
|align=center|5–0
|Matthew Strickland	
|KO (punch)
|Jorge Masvidal's iKon FC 3
|
|align=center|1
|align=center|0:27
|Richmond, Virginia, United States
|
|-
|Win
|align=center|4–0	
|Tyler Lee
|TKO (punches)
|Gamebred FC: Freedom Fight Night
|
|align=center|1
|align=center|0:26
|Miami, Florida, United States
|
|-
|Win
|align=center|3–0
|Dustin Clements
|TKO (leg injury)
|Jorge Masvidal's iKon FC 1
|
|align=center|3
|align=center|3:25
|West Palm Beach, Florida, United States
|
|-
|Win
|align=center|2–0
|Connor McKenna
|TKO (punches)
|Gamebred FC 3
|
|align=center|1
|align=center|0:33
|Biloxi, Mississippi, United States
|
|-
|Win
|align=center|1–0
|Matthew Strickland
|TKO (punches)
|Gamebred FC 2
|
|align=center|1
|align=center|0:15
|Biloxi, Mississippi, United States
|

References

External links
 
 Hamdy Abdelwahab at United World Wrestling 
 Hamdy Abdelwahab at Ultimate Fighting Championship 

1993 births
Living people
Egyptian male sport wrestlers
Olympic wrestlers of Egypt
Wrestlers at the 2016 Summer Olympics
Abdelwahab, Hamdy 
Heavyweight mixed martial artists 
Mixed martial artists utilizing Greco-Roman wrestling